Memmingen Airport , also known as Allgäu Airport Memmingen, is an international airport in the town of Memmingerberg near Memmingen, the third-largest city in the Swabia region of Bavaria. It is the smallest of the three commercial airports in the state after Munich Airport and Nuremberg Airport and has the highest altitude of any commercial airport in Germany. It is operated by Flughafen Memmingen GmbH, a limited partnership of mostly local, medium-sized companies and public shares.

It provides a low-cost alternative to Munich Airport and therefore is sometimes referred to as Memmingen/Munich-West Airport. It serves as a base for Ryanair and features flights to European leisure and some metropolitan destinations and handled nearly 2 million passengers in 2022.

History

Early years
A military airfield was built at Memmingerberg in 1935. It was used during World War II. After being rebuilt, it was used for US Air Force training flights from 1956. From 1959 to 2003, it was the home base of German Air Force fighterbomber wing 34 ("Allgäu").

The airport was certified as a regional commercial airport on 20 July 2004, and commenced operation on 5 August 2004, but there were no scheduled or regular chartered flights. Scheduled flights to the 2005 Hanover Fair were cancelled due to lack of demand. In June 2005, the district of Oberallgäu granted initial finance of €480,000. A further sum of €200,000 was granted by the city of Memmingen after a popular vote on 25 September 2005. In 2006, scheduled flights to Dortmund and Rostock were planned but cancelled because the carrier became insolvent. In autumn 2006, Luftfahrtgesellschaft Walter offered chartered flights to Dortmund for two months, during which only 100 passengers were carried.

In March 2007, a subsidy of €7,500,000 promised by the Bavarian government was approved by the European Commission. 

Until 25 September 2008, it was known as Allgäu Airport/Memmingen.

On 28 June 2007, TUIfly started offering domestic flights to Berlin, Hamburg, and Cologne, and also flights to holiday destinations such as Palma de Mallorca, Heraklion, Naples, Rome, Venice, and Antalya. In March 2009, Ryanair announced seven new routes serving Memmingen starting May 2009.

Developments since 2010
Ryanair has continued to announce new routes, and from May 2010 Ryanair operated 14 routes to and from Memmingen. Wizz Air also started serving Memmingen and has established eight routes since then. On 24 October 2013, Ryanair announced a new seasonal service to Shannon, while Palermo was added as a destination from the summer season of 2015. For the 2015 summer schedule, Wizz Air announced that it would expand its commitment and serve the cities of Tuzla in Bosnia and Herzegovina, the Bulgarian city of Sofia and the Lithuanian capital Vilnius.

On 5 June 2014, the airport welcomed its five-millionth passenger.

In December 2014, InterSky announced that it would be taking over the domestic flights from Memmingen to Berlin and Hamburg by 1 March 2015, as Germanwings had announced that it would cease the same services just a few days earlier. In earlier years, these routes had already been unsuccessfully served by TUIfly, Air Berlin, and Avanti Air. In May 2015, InterSky announced that it would have a presence at Memmingen Airport by October 2015 consisting of one aircraft, adding a new route to Cologne and increasing frequencies on the already existing services to Berlin and Hamburg. Later, that plan was changed to a triangular route of Friedrichshafen - Memmingen - Cologne/Bonn was to be established instead of basing an aircraft in Memmingen. However, on 6 November 2015, InterSky ceased all operations due to financial difficulties, leaving Memmingen again without any domestic connections.

In March 2017, Ryanair announced plans to establish its second Bavarian base (after Nuremberg Airport) in Memmingen from October 2017 consisting of one aircraft and seven additional routes. 
On 31 March 2019, another Ryanair aircraft was stationed in Memmingen and the workforce was increased to 70 employees. In December 2017, Memmingen Airport received its safety certification by the European Aviation Safety Agency. 2017 has been announced the first business year in which the airport achieved a profit at year end since the start of public services. In August 2018, the airport announced the schedule for its planned expansion which will take place from September 2018 until 2020. While the runway will be widened and its guidance system and lightning upgraded, the luggage facilities will see an expansion.

On 6 December 2018, the 10 millionth passenger was welcomed. In early 2019 the planned expansion works began to widen the runway and expand the handling facilities with the airport being closed for several weeks in September of the same year. The widened and refurbished runway has been inaugurated on 1 October 2019.

On 20 October 2022, Ryanair announced it would base an additional aircraft at Memmingen Airport, making a total of three Boeing 737 aircraft based at the airport. This would boost the number of destinations Ryanair serves from Memmingen to twenty-two.

Infrastructure

Terminal
Memmingen Airport has one passenger terminal building equipped with 10 check-in counters and 7 departure gates used for Schengen flights (1-3) on the ground floor and non-Schengen flights (4-7) on the upper floor. The building has no jet bridges, therefore walk-boarding and bus-boarding is used. There is also a duty-free shop, as well as some restaurants and car-hire facilities at the airport. The terminal has a capacity of two million passengers per year. In October 2021, a vastly expanded arrivals hall and baggage claim area was inaugurated.

Runway and apron
Memmingen Airport has an ILS Category 1 for runway 24 and is equipped with NDB/DME and GPS RNAV. However, an expansion to the international standard  had been granted in 2016 and was completed in September 2019. Simultaneously, the runway was equipped with new LED lighting, while an upgrade of the ILS for direction 06 is under preparation.

Two aprons provide parking spaces for six mid-sized aircraft such as the Airbus A320 and Boeing 737 at a time as well as some smaller business jets. There is an additional smaller apron for general aviation aircraft located on the other side of the runway.

Airlines and destinations
The following airlines operate regular scheduled and charter flights at Memmingen Airport:

Statistics

Ground transportation

Road
The airport is located close to the A96 motorway (Memmingen Ost exit) and its intersection with the A7 motorway. The A96 leads directly to Munich, Lake Constance, and Switzerland, while the A7 leads to Ulm, Northern Germany, and Austria. Taxis as well as several car-hire companies are available at counters in the terminal building.

Coach
There are dedicated coach services from Memmingen Airport directly to Munich (journey time approx. 80 minutes) as well as long-distance coaches operated by Flixbus to several cities within Germany and neighbouring countries.

Bus and Rail
Local bus lines 2 and 810/811 connect the airport within a 15-minute drive with Memmingen town centre, including Memmingen railway station, from where frequent Deutsche Bahn services depart for Munich (journey time approx. 1:00) and Augsburg (journey time approx. 1:10), as well as some EuroCity long-distance Swiss Federal Railways services to Bregenz and Zürich.

See also
 Transport in Germany
 List of airports in Germany

References

External links

 
 

Luftwaffe bases
Memm
Memmingen